The Engelhardt Institute of Molecular Biology (EIMB) is a research institute located in Moscow, Russia. The Institute is included in the Branch of Biological Sciences of the Russian Academy of Sciences and has the status of a State non-commercial organization.

History
The institute was founded on April 26, 1957 by Vladimir Engelgardt who became its first director. Until 1965 it was known as the Institute of Radiation and Physicochemical Biology of the Russian Academy of Sciences. On May 12, 1988 the institute was named after Vladimir Engelhardt.

Directors:
 1957–1984 — V. A. Engelhardt;
 1984–2003 — A. D. Mirzabekov;
 2003– — Alexander Alexandrovich Makarov.

Scientific activities
 molecular and cell engineering; bioengineering
 oncogenomics, oncodiagnostics, oncoprognosis, oncovirology
 mobile and repeating genetic elements and their evolution
 molecular immunology
 biopolymer structure and molecular dynamics
 the design of new biologically active compounds
 genetic enzymology
 signal transfer at molecular and cellular level
 plant genomics
 genomic and proteomic bioinformatics
 The development of fundamental principles of new molecular and cellular technologies and bionanotechnologies.

External links
EIMB web site

Molecular biology institutes
Institutes of the Russian Academy of Sciences
Research institutes in the Soviet Union
1957 establishments in the Soviet Union
Research institutes established in 1957